Changlang South is one of the 60 Legislative assembly constituencies in Arunachal Pradesh. Changlang South is located in Changlang, the district's administrative headquarters. It is one of the five constituencies located in the Changlang district.

Changlang South is located 237 km west of the state capital Itanagar.

Members of the Legislative Assembly

Election results

2019

See also
List of constituencies of Arunachal Pradesh Legislative Assembly
Arunachal Pradesh Legislative Assembly

References

External links

Villages in Changlang district
Assembly constituencies of Arunachal Pradesh